Mining district may refer to:

 Mining district (North America)
 Mining district (Europe)